Griveaudia atkinsoni is a moth in the family Callidulidae. It was described by Frederic Moore in 1879. It is found in India, Myanmar and Taiwan.

References

Callidulidae
Moths described in 1879